is the tenth compilation album by Japanese singer Shizuka Kudo. It was released on December 5, 2001, through Pony Canyon. The album is part of the label's greatest hits series My Kore!ction. It was later released digitally on July 1, 2012. An abridged version of the compilation, as per the My Kore!Lite series, was released on May 19, 2010. All sixteen songs were remastered digitally for the album. The My Kore!Lite edition was re-released on June 15, 2016 in Ultimate HQCD (UHQCD) format.

Commercial performance
Shizuka Kudo Best did not chart in the top 300 of the Oricon Albums Chart. However, the album has done well digitally since being released for download in 2012; it ranked as high as number 2 on the Recochoku Weekly Albums chart. The album ranked at number three on the Recochoku Monthly Albums chart, both in September 2014 and March 2015. It has steadily scored a spot on the Recochoku Year-end Albums chart, appearing on the yearly chart for four consecutive years: at number 15 in 2014, peaking at number 11 in 2015, at number 20 in 2016, and ranking at number 59 in 2017. Shizuka Kudo Best charted at number 23 on the Billboard Japan Hot Albums chart in March 2016.

Track listing

Charts

Release history

My Kore!ction edition

My Kore!Lite edition

References

External links
 Shizuka Kudo Best on Pony Canyon's official website

2001 greatest hits albums
Shizuka Kudo albums
Pony Canyon compilation albums